George, Prince of Georgia (Giorgi Batonishvili; , Tsarevich Georgi Vakhtangovich Gruzinsky) (August 2, 1712 – December 19, 1786) was a Georgian royal prince and a general in the Russian service.

Born to the king Vakhtang VI of Kartli of the House of Bagrationi-Mukhrani and Queen Rusudan, George followed his father into exile in Russia following the Ottoman occupation of Georgia in 1724. He established himself at Moscow and entered the Russian military service. During the Russo-Swedish War (1741–1743), he became a major-general and commanded a squadron of galleys. He distinguished himself in the campaign of the Rhine during the War of the Austrian Succession (1740–1748) and was promoted to lieutenant general in 1750. He also fought early in the Seven Years' War (1756–1763) and retired in 1759 with the rank of general-in-chief.

The prince also engaged in cultural enterprises of the Georgian colony at Moscow whose head he became following the death of his brother Bakar (1750). Himself a poet of some talent, George sponsored literary and scholarly activities in both Georgia and Russia. In 1785, he donated 10,000 rubles to the Imperial University of Moscow. He died in Moscow in 1786 and was interred at the familial burial ground at the Donskoy Monastery.

Marriage and issue

Prince George was married to Princess Maria Iakovna Dolgorukova by whom he had 3 children:
Vasily (1749–1764)
Jacob (1751–1768)
Anna (1754–1779)

References 

 History of the District of Koptevo, Moscow. Accessed on February 13, 2008.

1712 births
1786 deaths
House of Mukhrani
Georgian princes
Imperial Russian Army generals
Georgian generals-in-chief (Imperial Russia before 1798)
Georgian generals in the Imperial Russian Army
Russian military personnel of the Seven Years' War